Dominic Jeeva ; 27 June 1927 – 28 January 2021) was a Sri Lankan Tamil author. Jeeva was for a period of time forgotten as a writer. He first became known to non-Tamil speaking readers after a review of his short story collection Pathukai.

Early life 

His career began as a beautician in Jaffna, Sri Lanka. At that time, he was fascinated by Mahatma Gandhi, and the policies of Indian Congress Party. During this period he became acquainted with Tampo Rajagopal, who inspired him to read books, taught him to write and introduced him to other writers such as S. Ponnumdurai (author of the novel Sadangu). Later, Jeeva leaned towards leftist political movements and spoke in trade union meetings. He wrote his first story while working at the beauty parlour. He stated that the "beauty parlour is his university" and often praised Rajagopal as his mentor.

Career  

Though without an academic background, Jeeva became one of the most prominent writers in the Tamil world. He was the editor of Mallikai, a monthly journal on literature for more than four decades. Mallikai has been described as an important forum for the publication of progressive writing. The term 'progressive writing' was a euphemism for those with Communist leaning in the 1960s and 1970s. In their writings, these progressive writers attacked vehemently the linguistic jingoism of writers belonging to the Dravidian school. Mallikai promoted Moscow-based Communist writers during the Soviet era. In the 1960s Jeeva received a Sri Lanka Sahithya Academy Award. 

Jeeva was the author and publisher of many books and short stories. Jeeva established a publishing center called Mallikai Panthal.

He died on 28 January 2021, aged 93.

Bibliography

Essays

Biography

Other Books

Awards

See also 

 List of Tamils of Sri Lanka
 Tamil language
 Tamil literature

References 

Artscope, Daily News, 14 July 2004

 
Anubava Muththiraigal by Dominic Jeeva

Notes

External links 

 https://web.archive.org/web/20060424085953/http://www.sasnet.lu.se/EASASpapers/4AswiniMishra.pdf

1927 births
2021 deaths
Sri Lankan Tamil writers
Tamil activists
Sri Lankan Tamil literature
Sri Lankan Hindus